The 2018 Furman Paladins team represented Furman University as a member of the Southern Conference (SoCon) during the 2018 NCAA Division I FCS football season. Led by second-year head coach Clay Hendrix, the Paladins compiled an overall record of 6–4 with a mark of 6–2 in conference play, sharing the SoCon title with East Tennessee and Wofford.  After tiebreakers, Furman did not receive the SoCon's automatic bid to the NCAA Division I Football Championship playoffs and the team did not receive an at-large bid. Furman home games at Paladin Stadium in Greenville, South Carolina.

Previous season
The Paladins finished the 2017 season 8–5, 6–2 in SoCon play to finish in a tie for second place. They received an at-large bid to the FCS Playoffs where they defeated Elon in the first round before losing to Wofford in the second round.

Preseason

Preseason media poll
The SoCon released their preseason media poll on July 25, 2018, with the Paladins predicted to finish in second place. The same day the coaches released their preseason poll with the Paladins predicted to finish in third place.

Preseason All-SoCon Teams
The Paladins placed seven players on the preseason all-SoCon teams.

Offense

1st team

Kealand Dirks – RB

2nd team

Reed Kroeber – OL

Jake Walker – TE

Thomas Gordon – WR

Defense

1st team

Elijah McKoy – LB

Aaquil Annoor – DB

2nd team

Jaylan Reid – DL

Schedule

Game summaries

at Clemson

at Elon

at East Tennessee State

Western Carolina

Wofford

Samford

at The Citadel

Chattanooga

at VMI

at Mercer

Ranking movements

References

Furman
Furman Paladins football seasons
Southern Conference football champion seasons
Furman Paladins football